The 1983 African Men's Handball Championship was the fifth edition of the African Men's Handball Championship, held from 22 to 31 July 1983 at the Cairo International Stadium and the Police Arena in Cairo, Egypt.

It acted as the African qualifying tournament for the 1984 Summer Olympics in Los Angeles.

In the final, Algeria win their second consecutive title beating Congo in the final game.

Qualified teams

Draw

Group stage

Group A

Group B

Knockout stage

Bracket

Semi-finals

Third place game

Final

Final ranking

References

African handball championships
Handball
A
Handball
Handball in Egypt
1980s in Cairo
Sports competitions in Cairo
July 1983 sports events in Africa